Geoffrey Vincent Miller (born 26 January 1956) is a British retired Church of England priest and former school teacher. He served as Dean of Newcastle, before which he had been the Archdeacon of Northumberland since 2005.

Early life and education
Miller was born on 26 January 1956 in Manchester, England, to Harold and Vera Miller. He was educated at Sharston High School, a state school in Sharston, Manchester. He studied at the University of Durham, graduating with a Bachelor of Education (BEd) degree in 1977. He then worked as a teacher until he began training for ordained ministry.

Ordained ministry
In 1981, Miller entered St John's College, Nottingham, an Anglican theological college to be trained for ordained ministry. There, he completed a Diploma in Pastoral Studies (DPS) in 1983. He was ordained in the Church of England as a deacon in 1983 and as a priest in 1984.

After a curacy in Jarrow he was Team Vicar at St Aidan and St Luke, Billingham from 1986 to 1992; Urban Development Officer for the Diocese of Durham from 1991 to 1996; Vicar of St Cuthbert, Darlington from 1996 to 1999; and a residentiary canon at Newcastle Cathedral from 1995 until his archdeacon's appointment. He was installed as Dean of Newcastle on 20 October 2018, having served as acting dean from 4 February 2018. He retired November 2022.

References

1956 births
Alumni of Durham University
Archdeacons of Northumberland
Provosts and Deans of Newcastle
Living people
Clergy from Manchester
Heads of schools in England
Alumni of St John's College, Nottingham
People from Wythenshawe